The Belle Ainsworth Jenkins Estate, located near Beaverton, Oregon, United States, is listed on the National Register of Historic Places. Built starting in 1912, the main house on the property was intended as a summer home. The entire  estate is owned by the Tualatin Hills Park & Recreation District (THPRD). The estate has eight buildings, including the main home and a farmhouse built in 1880.

History
Ralph and Belle Jenkins purchased the property for $7,000 in 1912 for what was intended to be their summer home. Belle was the daughter of John C. Ainsworth, a founder of the Oregon Steam Navigation Company, while Ralph had been a teacher. The Jenkins began construction on a large estate that year as an escape from the city. The English hunting lodge-style main home took three years to complete, and was in addition to the original farmhouse on the property. Other facilities on the estate included fine equestrian facilities, as well as gardens, a greenhouse, an ornamental pool, a tea house, a carriage house, and a water tower.

Ralph Jenkins died in the 1950s; Belle died in 1963. Burt Muir inherited the property, but sold it to developers for what was planned to be a retirement community. Once the project failed due to a lack of water and sewer access, the developers put the estate up for sale. The Tualatin Hills Park & Recreation District purchased the Jenkins estate in 1976 for $525,000. In 1978, the estate was added to the National Register of Historic Places as the Belle Ainsworth Jenkins Estate.

The Tualatin Valley Chapter of the American Rhododendron Society started working with THPRD in 1982 to restore the rhododendron garden on the property. The park district restored the property in 1989 at a cost of $178,000. Camp Rivendale, a camp for adults and children with disabilities, was created in the 1980s. Due to operating losses at the property, THPRD decided to outsource management of the events at the estate in 2013; Elephants Delicatessen was selected to manage the events at what it calls the Jenkins Estate.

Details

The structures on the property are the main house, stable, carriage house, greenhouse, tea house, water tower, pump house, and the farmhouse. The  main house is L shaped with a full basement. THPRD rents out the buildings for business meetings, weddings, and other events. The Herb Garden was created in 1985 with help from the Oregon School of the Blind and contains a Braille Garden planted with fragrant herbs.

See also

 Maud and Belle Ainsworth House
 National Register of Historic Places listings in Washington County, Oregon

References

External links

Belle (Ainsworth) Jenkins profile on Wikitree.com

1880 establishments in Oregon
Houses in Washington County, Oregon
National Register of Historic Places in Washington County, Oregon
Jenkins Estate
Houses completed in 1880